Michael David Turnbull (born 24 March 1981) is an Australian former professional footballer, businessman, and television personality who played as goalkeeper and reality television contestant. Turnbull was a member of the Australian squad at the 2000 Summer Olympics in Sydney, and played in two FIFA World Youth Championships. Turnball also featured as one of the bachelors on Network Ten's The Bachelorette Australia in 2015.

Club career
Turnbull played with Marconi Stallions in the National Soccer League between 1997 and 2004.

In 2000, he briefly trained with AS Roma, however was never signed by the Italian club.

After leaving Marconi, Turnbull signed with Belgian team Standard Liège, however he was unable to break into the first team.

After leaving Belgium he signed with Bristol City for three years in England but had to return to Australia due to work visa issues.

In March 2006 Turnbull was signed by A-League team New Zealand Knights. He left at the end of the 2006–07 season after playing six matches for the Auckland team.

He later played for the Brisbane Strikers in NPL Queensland and in the FFA Cup.

On 24 April 2015, Melbourne Victory announced that they had signed Michael Turnbull leading into the A-League finals series. His stint ended without playing a game after the Victory went on to win the league's Premiership and Championship.

International career 
Turnbull played three matches for Australia U20 at the 1999 and 2001 FIFA World Youth Championships. At the 1999 tournament he played one match, a 4–0 loss against Ireland. At the 2001 tournament he played two games, a 2–0 win over Japan and a 3–0 loss to Czech Republic.

Turnbull was a member of the Australian team at the 2000 Summer Olympics where he was an unused substitute in Australia's three games.

After football
Turnbull featured as one of the bachelors on Network Ten's The Bachelorette Australia in 2015. He made it to the final two to compete for the love of Sam Frost. He lost to Sasha Mielczarek in the finale.

He was criticised early in the show for discussing his soccer career and claiming that he had played for the Australia national soccer team.

Since retiring as a footballer, Michael has worked in real estate.

Turnbull featured as one of the bachelors on Network Ten's Bachelor in Paradise Australia in 2018.

Turnbull was featured on A Current Affair, where Turnbull was found to have used false and misleading images. Turnbull was alleged to have been involved with skincare product Nerium, which A Current Affair alleged to be a potential pyramid scheme.

Career statistics

Honours

Club
Wollongong FC
 NSW Premier League Championship: 2008

Brisbane Strikers
 Canale Cup: 2014

Melbourne Victory
 A-League Championship: 2014–15
 A-League Premiership: 2014–15

International
Australia
 OFC U-20 Championship: 2001

See also
List of New Zealand Knights FC players

References

External links

1981 births
Living people
Association football goalkeepers
Australia youth international soccer players
Australia under-20 international soccer players
Australian Institute of Sport soccer players
Marconi Stallions FC players
Standard Liège players
New Zealand Knights FC players
Oakleigh Cannons FC players
Sydney United 58 FC players
Wollongong Wolves FC players
Sydney Olympic FC players
Brisbane Strikers FC players
Melbourne Victory FC players
National Soccer League (Australia) players
Victorian Premier League players
A-League Men players
National Premier Leagues players
Soccer players from Sydney
Australian expatriate soccer players
Expatriate footballers in Belgium
Australian expatriate sportspeople in Belgium
Olympic soccer players of Australia
Footballers at the 2000 Summer Olympics
Participants in Australian reality television series
Australian real estate agents
Bachelor Nation contestants
Australian soccer players
People educated at John Paul College (Brisbane)